James Ravenscroft (9 December 1854 – 3 January 1931) was an English cricketer. Ravenscroft was a right-handed batsman. He was born at Liverpool, Lancashire.

A club cricketer for Rock Ferry Cricket Club and Sefton Park Cricket Club, Ravenscroft made two first-class appearances for a combined Liverpool and District team, the first came against the touring Australians in 1888, while the second came in 1894 against Yorkshire, with both matches played at Aigburth Cricket Ground, Liverpool. Ravenscroft batted four times during his brief first-class career, being dismissed on all four occasions for ducks. Ravenscroft played in the Minor Counties Championship for Cheshire in 1895, making his debut for the county against Staffordshire. He appeared in four further matches for the county in that season.

He died at the city of his birth on 3 January 1931.

References

External links
James Ravenscroft at ESPNcricinfo
James Ravenscroft at CricketArchive

1854 births
1931 deaths
Cricketers from Liverpool
English cricketers
Liverpool and District cricketers
Cheshire cricketers